Paul Gobeil (born March 1, 1942) is a Canadian businessman and former politician. Gobeil was born in Saint-Rémi-de-Tingwick, Quebec.

From 1985 to 1989, Mr. Gobeil was a Liberal member of the National Assembly for the riding of Verdun  and served as Minister assigned to Administration, President of the Treasury Board and as Minister of International Affairs for the Government of Quebec.

References

External links
 

 

Quebec Liberal Party MNAs
1942 births
Living people
Businesspeople from Quebec
People from Centre-du-Québec
Université Laval alumni